Gvido Jekals (1 July 1904 – 2 January 1969) was a Latvian sprinter and decathlete. He competed in three events at the 1924 Summer Olympics.

References

External links
 

1904 births
1969 deaths
Latvian male sprinters
Athletes (track and field) at the 1924 Summer Olympics
Latvian decathletes
Olympic athletes of Latvia
Athletes from Riga
Olympic decathletes